AAI Group of Companies is one of the largest Filipino-owned logistics company. It has  a network that includes five separate logistics corporations, namely AAI Worldwide Logistics Inc., A2Z logistics Inc., Black Arrow Express, AAI+Peers, and  AAI Charity.   AAI Group's main base of operations is in Metro Manila, Philippines, with facilities for warehousing, distribution hubs and equipment pools throughout the country.

Divisions
AAI Group comprises five corporations:

 AAI Worldwide Logistics Inc. It was established in 1979 by Saturnino Belen as Airlift Asia, Inc. In 1980, Belen formed a partnership with Uldarico Brizuela, which helped expand the company's operations.
 A2Z logistics, Inc.
 AAI+Peers
 Black Arrow Express
 AAI Charity

References

Philippine brands
Holding companies of the Philippines
Companies based in Parañaque
Logistics companies of the Philippines